Charles Glass (born November 18, 1951) is an American-British author, journalist, broadcaster and publisher specializing in the Middle East and the Second World War.

He was ABC News chief Middle East correspondent from 1983 to 1993, and has worked as a correspondent for Newsweek and The Observer. He writes regularly for The New York Review of Books and his work has appeared in newspapers and magazines, and on television networks, all over the world.

Glass is the author of Tribes With Flags: A Dangerous Passage Through the Chaos of the Middle East (1991) and a collection of essays, Money for Old Rope: Disorderly Compositions (1992). A sequel to Tribes with Flags, called The Tribes Triumphant, was published by HarperCollins in June 2006. His book on the beginning of the American war in Iraq, The Northern Front, was published in October 2006 by Saqi.

His next book, Americans in Paris (HarperCollins and Penguin Press), tells the story of the American citizens who chose to remain in Paris when the Germans occupied the city in 1940. He also wrote "Deserter: The Untold Story of World War II" (Penguin Press and HarperCollins)  His most recent book is They Fought Alone: The True Story of the Starr Brothers, British Secret Agents in Nazi-Occupied France (Penguin Press, 2018).

One of Glass's best known stories was his 1985 interview on the tarmac of Beirut Airport of the crew of TWA Flight 847 after the flight was hijacked. He broke the news that the hijackers had removed the hostages and had hidden them in the suburbs of Beirut, which caused the Reagan administration to cancel a rescue attempt that would have failed and led to loss of life at the airport. Glass made headlines in 1987, when he was taken hostage for 62 days in Lebanon by Shi'a militants. He describes the kidnapping and escape in his book, Tribes with Flags.

Personal life
Glass was born in Los Angeles, California, on January 23, 1951, and holds dual US/UK citizenship. Raised as a Catholic, he earned a bachelor's degree in philosophy from the University of Southern California (USC), then undertook graduate studies at the American University of Beirut.

He lived in Beirut, Lebanon, for six years. He was married to Fiona Ross for seventeen years. He has three sons, one daughter and two stepdaughters and lives variously in France, Italy, Britain and Lebanon. His maternal grandmother was a Lebanese Maronite Catholic from Ehden, and his father's family emigrated from Ireland to Maryland in 1700.

Professional life

Glass began his career in 1973 with ABC News in Beirut, where he covered the Arab-Israeli war in Syria and Egypt with Peter Jennings. He became the network's chief Middle East correspondent, a position he held for ten years, before deciding to freelance. Since then, he has also worked with CNN and the BBC. In print, he has written for The New York Review of Books, The Independent, The Spectator, The Christian Science Monitor, Time, The Guardian, Chicago Daily News, The Daily Telegraph, The Sunday Telegraph, New Statesman, Times Literary Supplement, London Review of Books, Granta, Harper's Magazine, and The London Magazine.

He has made many documentary films for U.S. and British television, including Pity the Nation: Charles Glass' Lebanon; Iraq: Enemies of the State about military escalation and human rights abuses, broadcast six months before Iraq invaded Kuwait; Stains of War about war photographers; The Forgotten Faithful about the Palestinian Christian exodus from the West Bank; Our Man in Cairo; Islam for London Weekend Television; and Sadat: An Action Biography for ABC. Glass's film, Edward Said: The Last Interview, was shown at the ICA in London, the British Museum and other cinemas around the world.

He is a lecturer on Middle East and international affairs in Britain and the United States. He was the Books Editor of the Frontline Club Newsletter in London and is a publisher under his imprint, Charles Glass Books, in London.

Notable stories
Glass's one-hour documentary on Lebanon, Pity the Nation: Charles Glass's Lebanon, was broadcast in 20 countries, prompting the London Evening Standard critic to call it "one of the best and most heart-rending documentaries [he had] ever seen." Iraq: Enemies of the State, made for the BBC, was broadcast around the world six months before Saddam Hussein's invasion of Kuwait. He also made Stains of War (1992), and The Forgotten Faithful (1994), which looked at the situation of the Palestinian Christians who have left the West Bank.

In 1988, he revealed that Saddam Hussein had developed biological weapons. In 1991, he was the only American television correspondent to enter northern Iraq to cover the Kurdish rebellion from start to finish. In 1992, he took a hidden camera to East Timor, occupied by Indonesia, and filed a report that caused a U.S. Senate committee to vote for a suspension of military aid to Indonesia. From 1991 to 1993, he covered the war in Yugoslavia for ABC News and wrote about it in the Spectator.

He returned to Iraq in 2003 to cover the American invasion for ABC News and wrote about the war in Harper's Magazine with photographs by a friend, Don McCullin. He and McCullin covered Iraq again for Harper's in the autumn of 2016 to report on the war against the Islamic State and in 2017 recorded in words and photographs for Granta the destruction of the Roman ruins in Palmyra.

Glass won an Overseas Press Club award in 1976 for his radio reporting of the deaths of Palestinians at the Beirut refugee camp at Tel el Zaatar; and he has shared the British Commonwealth and Peabody Awards for documentary films. In 2011, he initiated his publishing imprint, Charles Glass Books, under the aegis of Quartet Books in London. His first publications were Stephane Hessel's Time for Outrage!, D.D. Guttenplan's American Radical: The Life and Times of I. F. Stone, John Bird and John Borrell's The White Lake, and Jeremy Clarke's Low Life: The Spectator Columns.

Works
Tribes With Flags: A Dangerous Passage Through the Chaos of the Middle East (hardcover and paperback), Atlantic Monthly Press, 1991;  (Published in the United Kingdom by Secker and Warburg, as well as Picador.) 
Money for Old Rope: Disorderly Compositions (paperback), Picador, 1992; 
The Tribes Triumphant (hardcover), HarperCollins, 2006 
The Northern Front: An Iraq War Diary (paperback), Saqi Books, 2006 
Americans in Paris: Life and Death Under the Nazi Occupation, 1940-1944 (hardcover), HarperCollins, 2009;  
The Deserters: A Hidden History of World War II, (hardcover) The Penguin Press, 2013 
Syria Burning: ISIS and the Death of the Arab Spring, OR Books, 2015 
Syria Burning: A Short History of a Catastrophe, VersoBooks, 2016 
They Fought Alone: The True Story of the Starr Brothers, British Secret Agents in Nazi-Occupied France (hardcover), Penguin Press, 2018

External links
 
 . Vice News (21 May 2015)
 https://worldview.stratfor.com/people/278436
 https://www.nybooks.com/contributors/charles-glass/

References

1951 births
Living people
American male journalists
American Roman Catholics
American people of Irish descent
American people of Lebanese descent
British male journalists
British Roman Catholics
British people of Irish descent
British people of Lebanese descent
Kidnappings by Islamists
Date of birth missing (living people)